Gomostapur is an upazila of Nawabganj District in the Division of Rajshahi, Bangladesh.

Geography

Gomostapur Upazila is bounded by Habibpur CD block in Malda district, West Bengal, India and Porsha Upazila, in Naogaon District, on the north, Niamatpur Upazila in Naogaon district and Nachol Upazila on the east, Nachol Upazila and Shibganj Upazila, Chapai Nawabganj on the south, and Bholahat Upazila, Shibganj Upazila and Habibpur CD block on the west.

Demographics
According to 2011 Bangladesh census, Gomostapur had a population of 275,823. Males constituted 49.42% of the population and females 50.58%. Muslims formed 93.05% of the population, Hindus 5.80%, Christians 0.88% and others 0.28%. Gomostapur had a literacy rate of 41.22% for the population 7 years and above.

As of the 1991 Bangladesh census, Gomostapur has a population of 191,972. Males constitute 50.66% of the population, and females 49.34%. This Upazila's eighteen up population is 96,032. Gomostapur has an average literacy rate of 32.9%, and the national average of 32.4% literate.

Administration
Gomostapur Upazila is divided into Gomostapur Municipality and eight union parishads: Alinagar, Bhangabari, Boalia, Chowdala, Gomostapur, Parbotipur, Radhanagar, and Rahanpur. The union parishads are subdivided into 166 mauzas and 234 villages.

Gomostapur Municipality is subdivided into 9 wards and 33 mahallas.

Education
The major educational institutes in Gomostapur are:

See also
Upazilas of Bangladesh
Districts of Bangladesh
Divisions of Bangladesh

References

 
Upazilas of Chapai Nawabganj District